Delphian is an all-caps display typeface created by R. Hunter Middleton in 1928 and published in metal by Ludlow. A digital version was issued by Monotype. Delphian has a modern, yet classic style and is notable for having no lower-case characters. One website commented on Middleton's font, "His tour de force, Delphian Open Title, invokes that rare intellectual response, admiration." It is seldom used today, except to evoke an art deco aura.

References

Display typefaces
Letterpress typefaces
Digital typefaces
Typefaces designed by R. Hunter Middleton